The 2007 Kuril Islands earthquake occurred east of the Kuril Islands on 13 January at . The shock had a moment magnitude of 8.1 and a maximum Mercalli intensity of VI (Strong). The earthquake is considered a doublet of the 8.3 magnitude 2006 Kuril Islands earthquake which occurred two months prior on 15 November 2006 approximately 95 km to the southeast.

See also
1963 Kuril Islands earthquake
1994 Kuril Islands earthquake
 List of earthquakes in 2007
 List of earthquakes in Japan
 Kamchatka earthquakes
 Okhotsk Plate

References

Bibliography

 .
 .
.

External links

Doublet earthquakes
Kuril Islands earthquake
Kuril Islands earthquake
2007 Kuril Islands earthquake
Earthquakes in the Russian Far East
2007 tsunamis
Tsunamis in Russia
2007 disasters in Russia
January 2007 events in Japan
Kuril Islands
January 2007 events in Russia
2007 disasters in Japan